Point Reyes Light can refer to:

 Point Reyes Lighthouse, also known as the Point Reyes Light
 The Point Reyes Light (newspaper), a newspaper